WXTR may refer to:

 WXTR (FM), a radio station (89.9 FM) licensed to serve Tappahannock, Virginia, United States
 One of several radio stations in the Washington, D.C. market:
 WPRS-FM, 104.1 FM, Waldorf, Maryland, which used the callsign WXTR-FM from 1981 through 1996
 WWFD, 820 AM, Frederick, Maryland, which used the callsign WXTR from 1996 through 2006
 WTNT (AM), 730 AM, Alexandria, Virginia, which used the callsign WXTR from 2006 through 2010